Howitt is a coastal locality in the Shire of Carpentaria, Queensland, Australia.

Geography

Howitt is on the western coast of Cape York Peninsula facing the Gulf of Carpentaria. The Burke Developmental Road passes through the locality from north-east (Yagoonya) to the south-west (Normanton). The Karumba Road from the west (Karumba) joins the Burke Developmental Road in Howitt.

History 
Many towns and localities in this area have names connected to the Burke and Wills expedition. Although not officially recorded, it is likely that Howitt is named after Alfred William Howitt, who led a relief mission that rescued the only survivor John King and buried the bodies of Burke and Wills (Howitt later disinterred the bodies and returned them to Melbourne for burial).

Education 
There are no schools in Howitt. The nearest schools are in Karumba (P-6) and Normanton (P-10). There are no schools offering secondary Years 11 and 12 in the area.

References

External links

Shire of Carpentaria
Coastline of Queensland
Localities in Queensland